The Parish Apprentices Act 1842 (5 & 6 Vict. c. 4) was an Act of Parliament in the United Kingdom, which received the Royal Assent on 23 March 1842 and was repealed in 1927. It extended "the power of magistrates to adjudicate in cases in which no premium has been paid". The Act was repealed by the Poor Law Act 1927.

References
The companion to the British almanac, for the year 1843, p. 129. London, 1843.
Chronological table of the statutes; HMSO, London. 1993. 

United Kingdom Acts of Parliament 1842
Repealed United Kingdom Acts of Parliament